Georgios Bakos (1892–1945) was a Hellenic Army officer. 

Born in Athens in 1892, he became a career officer and fought in the Asia Minor Campaign. As a Major General, he commanded the 3rd Infantry Division in the Greco-Italian War of 1940–41. 

After the German invasion of Greece and the Hellenic Army's capitulation, he served as Minister of National Defence in the collaborationist government set up by Lt. General Georgios Tsolakoglou on 30 April 1941, and retained the post under Tsolakoglou's successor Konstantinos Logothetopoulos, until the Logothetopoulos cabinet's resignation on 7 April 1943. An ardent Germanophile, Bakos helped in the formation of ESPO and tried, without success, to raise a Greek volunteer unit to fight along the German Wehrmacht in the Eastern Front.

After liberation he was arrested and placed in Averof prison in Athens waiting trial. During the Dekemvriana events, a group of EAM-ELAS guerrillas under officer Stavros Mavrothalassitis attacked the prison. Bakos was taken prisoner and after a court-martial was executed as a traitor on 6 January 1945.

References 

1892 births
1945 deaths
Greek military personnel of World War I
People sentenced to death by ELAS
Hellenic Army generals of World War II
Greek military personnel of the Greco-Turkish War (1919–1922)
Ministers of National Defence of Greece
People who were court-martialed

Military personnel from Athens
Executed Greek collaborators with Nazi Germany